Dr. Bhimrao Ambedkar Airstrip is an airstrip-aerodrome, situated at Partapur, 9 km south of Village Gagol of Meerut, in Uttar Pradesh, India. The airstrip, spread across 47 acres, has only non scheduled chartered flights. The government of Uttar Pradesh signed a MoU with the Airports Authority of India (AAI) in February 2014 for the development of the airport. It is named after B. R. Ambedkar.

The AAI had initially proposed the development of the airport to provide better air connectivity in the western parts of the state, which had already been assessed for upgrading to cater to scheduled operations. AAI presented a master plan to the state government in April 2012 seeking the transfer of the airstrip and additional land free of cost and free from all encumbrances. The then Union civil aviation minister Ajit Singh had urged the state government in November 2012 to hand over the airstrip and an additional 427 acres to AAI for development. The Uttar Pradesh cabinet approved to hand over the airstrip AAI in September 2013.

The state had earlier planned to build a new airport of international standard on same location. The state government had issued a notice for appointing a consultant to prepare a comprehensive feasibility project report, a bid document and the concession agreement for the proposed airport. The project would be implemented through public-private partnership on a design, build, finance, operate and transfer basis. The state government decided to have an international airport at Meerut based on a study conducted on the area's traffic density. Following this, the Ministry of Civil Aviation gave its in-principle approval.  The need for a second airport on the fringes of the national capital region has been a long-standing demand of the Uttar Pradesh government, especially in view of the burgeoning air traffic at Delhi airport.  The proposed airport will not only cater to the industrial towns of western Uttar Pradesh but would relieve neighbouring Uttarakhand.

References 

Airports in Uttar Pradesh
Proposed airports in Uttar Pradesh
Memorials to B. R. Ambedkar
Buildings and structures in Meerut
Transport in Meerut